Saint John Fleeing Christ's Arrest is a c. 1522 oil on canvas painting now in the Galleria nazionale di Parma. It is a copy (probably by an Emilian artist) of a lost original by Correggio.

History

References

Bibliography
  Giuseppe Adani, Correggio pittore universale, Silvana Editoriale, Correggio 2007.

External links

Paintings depicting the Arrest of Christ
Collections of the Galleria nazionale di Parma
Lost paintings
Paintings by Correggio
1522 paintings
Paintings depicting John the Apostle